Tiszakécske is a town in Bács-Kiskun county, Hungary and the administrative centre of the Tiszakécske District. It is also famous of its spa and recreational parks.

Notable people
Zoltán Varga (born 1977), footballer
József Bujáki (born 1975), footballer
Zoltán Bánföldi (born 1971), footballer
János Zováth (born 1977), footballer
Ernő Kovács (born 1959), mechanical technician, politician, Mayor of Tiszakécske 1998–2014
Ferenc Seres (born 1945), wrestler

Sports
The town has its own football club, the Tiszakécske FC.

Twin towns – sister cities

Tiszakécske is twinned with:
 Lübbecke, Germany
 Lunca de Sus, Romania

References

External links

 in Hungarian

Populated places in Bács-Kiskun County
Towns in Hungary